Dag Bredberg (born 21 April 1955) is a retired Swedish ice hockey player. Bredberg was part of the Djurgården Swedish champions' team of 1983. Bredberg made 131 Elitserien appearances for Djurgården.

References

External links

1955 births
Djurgårdens IF Hockey players
Färjestad BK players
Living people
Nacka HK players
Sportspeople from Jönköping
Swedish ice hockey forwards
Winnipeg Jets (WHA) draft picks